Cadaver is a death metal band from Råde and Fredrikstad, Norway. The band had a brief venture in the early 1990s before splitting in 1993. Cadaver would eventually re-emerge as Cadaver Inc. in 1999 which consisted of only one founding member. For their next album, they fell back to using their original band name Cadaver and ended their activities in 2004, with their final live show in 2005. The band reformed in April 2019 and released their fifth album in 2020.

History 
Anders Odden and Ole Bjerkebakke founded Cadaver in 1988. They were later joined by bassist René Jansen and in 1989 the trio released the "Abnormal Deformity" demo. The demo attracted the attention of Carcass members, Bill Steer and Jeff Walker, who signed the band to their Earache imprint label, Necrosis. The subsequent album, Hallucinating Anxiety was released in 1990 as a split with the Carnage album Dark Recollections. Shortly after the album's release, René Jansen was replaced by Eilert Solstad. In 1992, the band released their second album, titled ...In Pains. Dissension within the band would cause the band to fold in 1993.

In 1999 the band was resurrected by Odden, who went by the name Neddo. He gathered three new musicians, and started to use the band name Cadaver Inc. The foursome, now including Czral, L.J. Balvaz and Apollyon, recorded the album Discipline which was released in February 2001. A tour followed in support of Morbid Angel and Extreme Noise Terror. Accompanying the album was a website that claimed to sell alibis for murders. This website attracted too much attention and hence the original name was restored. The band then embarked on an ill-fated American tour in April 2002, which had several of its dates cancelled when their booking agent was wanted by the police and went on the run. The band dropped the word "Inc." from its name after returning home the United States.

Their final album was then released in 2004 titled Necrosis. The band decided to split up in 2004 with their last live show in 2005. Cadaver never left Anders Odden as an idea completely and in 2014 he decided to record a 5th album with Dirk Verbeuren as his drummer and musical companion.

In April 2019, it was announced Odden had reformed the band with current Megadeth/ex-Soilwork drummer Dirk Verbeuren.

In September 2020, the band announced that their new album would be titled Edder & Bile. It was released on 27 November.

Line-up 
Anders Odden – guitar, bass, vocals
Dirk Verbeuren – drums
Eilert Solstad – double bass (1990–1993, 2019–present)

Former members 
Ole Bjerkebakke- drums, Vocals (1988–1993, 1995)
René Jansen – bass (1989–1990)
Espen Sollum – guitar (1990)
Apollyon (Ole Jørgen Moe) – vocals, bass (see also Immortal, Aura Noir, Dødheimsgard) (2002–2004)
L.J. Balvaz (Lasse Johansen) – guitar, bass (2002–2004)
Czral (Carl-Michael Eide) – drums (see also Ved Buens Ende, Dødheimsgard, Aura Noir) (2002–2004)

Timeline

Discography

Full-length albums 
Hallucinating Anxiety (Necrosis, 1990)
...In Pains (Earache, 1992)
Discipline (Earache, 2001)
Necrosis (Candlelight, 2004)
 Edder & Bile (Nuclear Blast, 2020)

Demos 
Into the Outside (1988)
Abnormal Deformity (1989)
Sunset at Dawn (1989) (Live demo)
Demo 2 (1990) (Unreleased tape, no cover art)
Hymns of Misanthropy (1991) (Unreleased pre-prod of the ...In Pains album)Primal 1999 (EP, 1999)D.G.A.F. (EP, 2020)

 Live albums Live Inferno (2002)

 Split albums Cadaver/Voice of Hate'' (2006)

References

External links 
Official website (archived)
Official MySpace page

Norwegian death metal musical groups
Musical groups established in 1988
1988 establishments in Norway
Musical groups disestablished in 1993
1993 disestablishments in Norway
Musical groups reestablished in 1999
Musical groups disestablished in 2004
2004 disestablishments in Norway
Musical quartets
Earache Records artists
Musical groups from Østfold
Musicians from Råde